Daphnella pulviscula is a species of sea snail, a marine gastropod mollusc in the family Raphitomidae.

Description
The length of the shell attains 23 mm.

Distribution
This species of sea snail occurs within south-western Japan and the western Pacific Ocean.

References

 Chino M. (2006) A new species of Daphnella (Gastropoda: Conidae) from south-western Japan and the western Pacific. Novapex 7: 17–20

External links
 Bouchet, Philippe, et al. "A quarter-century of deep-sea malacological exploration in the South and West Pacific: where do we stand? How far to go." Tropical deep-sea Benthos 25 (2008): 9–40
 Gastropods.com: Daphnella pulviscula

pulviscula
Gastropods described in 2006